That Healin' Feelin' is an album by jazz organist Richard "Groove" Holmes which was recorded in 1968 and released on the Prestige label.

Reception

Allmusic awarded the album 5 stars stating "Holmes is at the helm of a strong quartet on That Healin' Feelin', with especially notable contributions from Rusty Bryant (himself a soul-jazz artist of note) on sax and Billy Butler on guitar".

Track listing 
 "That Healin' Feelin'" (Les McCann) - 8:43  
 "See See Rider" (Ma Rainey) - 6:20  
 "Irene Court" (Billy Butler) - 4:42  
 "Castle Rock" (Ervin Drake, Al Sears, Jimmy Shirl) - 5:20  
 "Laura" (Johnny Mercer, David Raksin) - 8:15  
 "On a Clear Day (You Can See Forever)" (Burton Lane, Alan Jay Lerner) - 8:08

Personnel 
Richard "Groove" Holmes - organ
Rusty Bryant - tenor saxophone, alto saxophone
Billy Butler - guitar
Herbie Lovelle - drums

References 

Richard Holmes (organist) albums
1968 albums
Prestige Records albums
Albums recorded at Van Gelder Studio
Albums produced by Cal Lampley